Iota Boötis (ι Boo, ι Boötis) is a member of a binary star system in the constellation Boötes, approximately 96 light-years from Earth. It has the traditional name Asellus Secundus  (Latin for "second donkey colt") and the Flamsteed designation 21 Boötis.  The companion is HD 234121, a K0 main sequence star.

Components

Iota Boötis has a companion at an angular distance of 38.6 arcseconds, easily separated with binoculars.

The primary component is a white A-type main-sequence dwarf with a mean apparent magnitude of +4.75. It is classified as a Delta Scuti-type variable star and its brightness varies from magnitude +4.73 to +4.78 with a stable period of 38 minutes.

The companion, HD 234121, is a magnitude 7.3 main-sequence star belonging to spectral class K0V.

The Washington Double Star Catalog lists a third component, a 14th-magnitude star at 90 arcseconds, but it is an unrelated background star.

Nomenclature
This star, along with the other Aselli (θ Boo and κ Boo) and λ Boo, were Aulād al Dhiʼbah (أولاد الضّباع - awlād al-ḍibā‘), "the Whelps of the Hyenas".

References

External links
 HR 5350
 CCDM J14162+5122
 Image Iota Boötis
 The Constellations and Named Stars

125161
069713
Bootis, Iota
Boötes
Delta Scuti variables
Bootis, 21
Spectroscopic binaries
Triple star systems
A-type main-sequence stars
Asellus Secundus
K-type main-sequence stars
5350
BD+52 1784